The 2022 season was the Kansas City Chiefs' 53rd in the National Football League, their 63rd overall, their 10th under head coach Andy Reid, and their sixth under general manager Brett Veach. The Chiefs finished the regular season 14–3, improving their win total from the previous season and matching the franchise record for wins.

In the offseason, the Chiefs traded wide receiver Tyreek Hill to the Miami Dolphins. Hill had been with the Chiefs since 2016.

The Chiefs wore a decal with the number 16 on their helmets for the entire season in honor of former Chiefs quarterback and Super Bowl IV MVP Len Dawson, who died on August 24, and wore 16 his entire tenure with the Chiefs. Before the Chiefs first offensive play of the preseason game the following day, the Chiefs lined in a huddle popularized by Dawson where the quarterback stands in front of all other 10 offensive players instead of the quarterback standing in the middle with the players making a circle around him.

After their ninth victory in Week 12 over the Los Angeles Rams, the Chiefs clinched their 10th consecutive winning season, a franchise record. With a Week 15 win over the Houston Texans, they won the AFC West for the seventh consecutive year. It also was the Chiefs' franchise record extending eighth straight year making the playoffs. With a Week 18 win against the Raiders, and the Bills–Bengals game in Week 17 declared a no contest, the Chiefs clinched the top seed in the AFC. The Chiefs hosted their fifth consecutive AFC Championship Game, where they defeated the Cincinnati Bengals 23–20. In Super Bowl LVII, the Chiefs defeated the Philadelphia Eagles 38–35. It was the Chiefs' third Super Bowl appearance and second win in four years.

NFL Top 100

The Chiefs only had three players ranked in the 2022 Top 100 players, their lowest number of selections since 2018. Quarterback Patrick Mahomes was once again the highest ranked player for the Chiefs on the countdown despite dropping 7 places in the rankings.

Offseason
All transactions in this section occurred between the end of the 2021 season (excluding futures contracts which began to be signed following the conclusion of the regular season) and the Chiefs first preseason game.

Coaching staff changes

Players lost
Below are players who were on the roster at the end of the 2021 season, but were either released or did not re-sign after their contract expired.

Futures contracts
Players signed to futures contracts typically most, if not all, if the 2021 season on the Chiefs or another team's practice squad. These contracts are signed after the conclusion of the regular season through the beginning the next league year.

Players added
Players below played for another team in 2021 and signed with the Chiefs.

Trades
Listed below are trades were a player was included in the trade.

Draft

Draft trades

Undrafted free agents

Signed and released in the offseason
Players listed below were signed and released in the offseason before playing for the team.

Preseason transactions
All transactions below occurred in between the Chiefs first preseason game on August 13 and their first regular season game on September 11.

Signings

Cuts
The Chiefs made their first set of roster cut downs on August 16. They made another three cuts on August 23, they also placed two on reserve lists. Their final roster cut, which will be 27 cuts, will occur by August 30. The Chiefs also placed players on reserve lists to meet the roster requirements.

Down to 85

Down to 80

Down to 53

Regular season transactions
Transactions below occurred after the Chiefs first game on September 11 and through their final game, which includes the playoffs.

Standard elevations
Players listed below were elevated using a standard elevation, which allows the Chiefs to add someone to the active roster from the practice squad then move back to the practice squad without needing to clear waivers first. This can only be used a maximum of 3 times per player.

Signings

Suspensions served

Cuts

Trades
Listed below are trades were a player was included in the trade.

IR activations
Players listed below spent a portion of the season on injured reserve and were activated.

Staff

Final roster

Preseason

Regular season

Schedule

Note: Intra-division opponents are in bold text.

Game summaries

Week 1: at Arizona Cardinals

Week 2: vs. Los Angeles Chargers

Week 3: at Indianapolis Colts

Week 4: at Tampa Bay Buccaneers

Week 5: vs. Las Vegas Raiders

Week 6: vs. Buffalo Bills

Week 7: at San Francisco 49ers

Week 9: vs. Tennessee Titans

Week 10: vs. Jacksonville Jaguars

Week 11: at Los Angeles Chargers

Week 12: vs. Los Angeles Rams

Week 13: at Cincinnati Bengals

Week 14: at Denver Broncos

Week 15: at Houston Texans

Week 16: vs. Seattle Seahawks

Week 17: vs. Denver Broncos

Week 18: at Las Vegas Raiders

Standings

Division

Conference

Postseason

Schedule

Game summaries

AFC Divisional Playoffs: vs. (4) Jacksonville Jaguars

AFC Championship: vs. (3) Cincinnati Bengals

Super Bowl LVII: vs. (N1) Philadelphia Eagles

Notes

References

External links
 

Kansas City
Kansas City Chiefs seasons
Kansas City Chiefs
AFC West championship seasons
American Football Conference championship seasons
Super Bowl champion seasons